J33 may refer to:
 Allison J33, a turbojet engine
 de Havilland J 33 Venom, a British fighter in service with the Swedish Air Force
 Ground Equipment Facility J-33, a former radar station in California
 LNER Class J33, a British steam locomotive class
 Malaysia Federal Route J33
 Nasal polyp
 Pentagonal gyrocupolarotunda, a Johnson solid (J33)
 Small nucleolar RNA J33